Bayou Vista can refer to a place in the United States:

Bayou Vista, Louisiana
Bayou Vista, Texas